Static Peak is a mountain peak in the U.S. state of Colorado, within State Forest State Park and part of the Never Summer Mountain Range. It is located in a chain of peaks and lies between Nokhu Crags to the north and Mount Richthofen to the south. To the east lie the shallow basins of Snow Lake and to the west the mountain descends directly into the deep waters of Lake Agnes.

Geology
Approximately 24–29 million years ago, rising magma began to create volcanoes that were the predecessors of the Never Summer Mountains. The magma cooled into granitic formations that have weathered into the current mountain range.

See also

List of Colorado mountain ranges
List of Colorado mountain summits
List of Colorado fourteeners
List of Colorado 4000 meter prominent summits
List of the most prominent summits of Colorado
List of Colorado county high points

References

External links

SummitPost.org
Rocky Mountain National Park, Geology Field Notes
Local Backcountry Advocacy

Mountains of Rocky Mountain National Park
Mountains of Grand County, Colorado
Mountains of Jackson County, Colorado
North American 3000 m summits
Great Divide of North America